

Events

Arts and literature

Births
Gaetano Reina, Joe Masseria Capo 
Louis Pioggi, "Louie the Lump", Five Points Gang member
January 27 – Frank Nitti, Chicago Outfit mobster, in Augori, Sicily

Deaths

References
Schoenberg, Robert. Mr. Capone. New York: HarperCollins, 1992.

Years in organized crime
Organized crime